Conrad was a comic strip about "America's favorite frog prince". Written and illustrated by Bill Schorr, the strip was launched November 8, 1982. Syndicated by Tribune Media Services, it had a run for over three years, ending June 7, 1986.

Characters and story
The frog Conrad, needing money to pay his bookie, convinces the fat, dim-witted fairy tale princess that he is an enchanted prince who can be turned into a human by a kiss.

Other characters include the princess' father, the King, who is skeptical that Conrad is a prince, and resident witch Aggie, who grants spells and potions to the princess. Fido, the princess's pet alligator, thinks he is a dog.

TV appearance
A live action Conrad sketch (with a large puppet portraying the frog) was included in the special Mother's Day Sunday Funnies broadcast May 8, 1983 on NBC.

More by Schorr
The strip did not catch on and was dropped in the summer of 1986. In addition to editorial cartoons, Bill Schorr went on to create two more comic strips: The Grizzwells (1987–present) and Phoebe's Place (1990-1991).

Books
Two Conrad book collections were published in 1985.

References

American comic strips
1982 comics debuts
1986 comics endings
Fictional princes
Fictional frogs
Fictional medieval European people
Comics characters introduced in 1982
Gag-a-day comics
Comics set in the Middle Ages
Comic strips syndicated by Tribune Content Agency
Comics about amphibians
Comics about animals